Donald Mainland FRSE FRSC (1902-1985) was a Scots-born medical statistician who became a Professor at the New York University. He is remembered for his series of Mainland's Notes.


Life
He was born in Edinburgh in 1902, the son of William Mainland, a confectioner running a shop at 140 St Stephen Street in the Stockbridge area.

He studied medicine at the University of Edinburgh graduating with an MB ChB and gaining a doctorate (DSc) in 1930. He was a lecturer in anatomy at the University of Edinburgh and was elected a Fellow of the Royal Society of Edinburgh in 1938. His proposers were Ernest Cruickshank, James Couper Brash, Alfred Joseph Clark and Ivan De Burgh Daly. In 1954 he was named a Fellow of the American Statistical Association. He resigned from the Royal Society of Edinburgh in 1965.

In 1949 he emigrated to Nova Scotia to take on the role of Professor of Anatomy at Dalhousie University. His personality clashed with his junior colleague, Dr Richard Holbourne Saunders (who then replaced him) and one year later he was appointed Professor of Biostatics in the Department of Preventative Medicine at the Bellevue Hospital Medical College in New York City in the United States. In 1953 he moved to the Department of Medical Statistics as its Chairman.

Publications
Mainland's Notes from a Laboratory of Medical Statistics
Mainland's Statistical Ward Rounds
Mainland's Notes on Biometry in Medical Research
Mainland's Elementary Medical Statistics''' (1952)Statistical Tables for Use in Binomial Samples''

References

1902 births
1985 deaths
Alumni of the University of Edinburgh
Academics of the University of Edinburgh
Scottish anatomists
Fellows of the Royal Society of Edinburgh
Fellows of the Royal Society of Canada
Fellows of the American Statistical Association
British emigrants to the United States